Thomas Lutwyche (baptised 1675 – 1734) of the Inner Temple and Lutwyche Hall, Shropshire,  was an English lawyer and Tory politician who sat in the House of Commons almost continuously from 1710 to 1734.

Life 

Lutwyche was the son of Sir Edward Lutwyche, Justice of the Common Pleas, and his wife Anne Tourneur, daughter of Sir Timothy Tourneur. He was a scholar at Westminster School, and was elected to Christ Church, Oxford, where he matriculated 4 July 1692, but took no degree.

Lutwyche was called to the bar at the Inner Temple in 1697. He was reader there in 1715, and treasurer of the inn in 1722.

Lutwyche was reluctant to enter politics, and did so in the end with the backing of Thomas Tufton, 6th Earl of Thanet. At the 1715 general election he was returned unopposed for Appleby.

A High Tory, Lutwyche was made Q.C. in 1710. He rejected an offer from Robert Harley to become a judge, in 1711. He delivered on 6 November 1723 a speech in parliament against the bill for taxing Catholics.

At the end of his life, in 1734, Lutwyche bought Wilderhope Manor from Thomas Smalman. He died on 13 November 1734, and was buried in the Inner Temple Church.

Works
Lutwyche left some manuscript law reports from the Queen's Bench. They were published in 1781, in pt. xi. of Modern Reports.

Family
Lutwyche married Elizabeth Bagnall, daughter of William Bagnall of Bretforton and had 2 sons and 3 daughters. Their daughter Anne married Nicholas Fazakerley; their third daughter Sarah married Thomas Geers (died 1753), Member of Parliament for Hereford.

Notes

External links
Attribution

Year of birth missing
1734 deaths
English barristers
Members of the Parliament of Great Britain for English constituencies
British MPs 1710–1713
British MPs 1713–1715
British MPs 1722–1727
British MPs 1727–1734
Members of the Inner Temple